The Curlew Valley is a  long valley located on the northern edge of the Great Salt Lake in Box Elder County in northern Utah and extending north into Oneida County in southern Idaho.

Within northeast Box Elder County, the southwest of the valley abuts the Locomotive Springs Wildlife Management Area and an extensive salt flat on the edge of the Great Salt Lake.

Description
The Curlew Valley trends southwest to northeast with Deep Creek towards the valley's west. At the valley's northeast, Deep Creek turns east, then almost due north into Idaho, meeting the unincorporated community of Stone and the south border of the Curlew National Grassland. Adjacent to Stone, upstream and south is the townsite of Snowville, Utah on Interstate 84, which traverses the valley diagonally from the northwest (Idaho) by southeast. The route goes through the divide between the Hansel Mountains (south) and the North Hansel Mountains and continues southeast through the Blue Creek Valley, the south West Hills and continues on to Brigham City.

The Curlew Valley center is slightly east-southeast of Coyote Springs, on Deep Creek. A mountain peak, Cedar Hill lies adjacent eastwards, . Directly west and south of Coyote Springs lies another peak, Wildcat Hills, .

Rose Ranch Reservoir

History

Curlew Valley, named after the curlew snipe that nests there. The first recorded white men were Peter Skene Ogden's large party of trappers that camped on Deep Creek on December 27, 1828.

The beginning of Deep Creek is a large spring at Holbrook, which runs through the center of the valley and has never varied even in dry years.

The old pioneer trail and the stage line went through their ranch.

The first townsite in the Curlew Valley was  Snowville. Settled at the direction of Brigham Young and named in honor of Lorenzo Snow: an apostle at the time, but later to become the 5th President of the Church of Jesus Christ of Latter-day Saints 1898–1901. Snowville was laid out on August 14, 1878.

See also
 List of valleys of Utah

References

External links

Coyote Spring
 Coyote Spring, (coordinates, (elevation))

Cedar Hill Summit & Wildcat Hills
 Cedar Hill Summit, mountainzone.com (coordinates, (elevation)), 41.844088-N, 112.866649-W, 5184 ft

Valleys of Utah
Valleys of Idaho
Landforms of Box Elder County, Utah
Landforms of Oneida County, Idaho